Abbas Bayat (born 14 July 1947 in Tehran) was an Iranian businessman. He was the chairman of Belgian football club Charleroi.

References

External links 
 Ohne die Familie Bayat läuft in Charleroi seit 2000 nichts mehr

20th-century Iranian businesspeople
Iranian expatriates in Belgium
Iranian football chairmen and investors
Businesspeople from Tehran
1947 births
Living people